The WOMEX Awards also known  as World Music Expo Award is an established award for World music. It was first introduced in 1999 to honor the high points of world music on an international level and to acknowledge musical excellence, social importance, commercial success, political impact and lifetime achievement.  Every October at the WOMEX event, the award figurine - an ancient mother goddess statue dating back about 6000 years to the Neolithic age - is presented in an award ceremony to a worthy member of the world music community.

In 2008 the Award concept was refined and two awards were offered: one for Artists and one for Professional Excellence.

The WOMEX Top Label Award was created in 2006 as a joint project with World Music Charts Europe (WMCE). The selection for the WOMEX Top Label Award has been made until 2016 using the charts of 45 radio broadcasters from 25 countries collected over 12 months from October to September. In 2017 the monthly charts of the Transglobal World Music Chart (TWMC) have been added with equal weight, featuring a diverse range of experts and journalists with a global background,

Awards

See also
Awards for world music
World Music Expo

References

World music awards
Awards established in 1999